Mennonites in Paraguay are either ethnic Mennonites with mostly Flemish, Frisian and Prussian ancestry and who speak Plautdietsch or of mixed (southern European/Amerindian) or Amerindian ancestry like the vast majority of Paraguayans. Ethnic Mennonites contribute heavily to the agricultural and dairy output of Paraguay.

History

In the 1760s,Catherine the Great of Russia invited Mennonites from Prussia to settle north of the Black Sea in exchange for religious freedom and exemption from military service, a precondition founded in their commitment to non-violence. After Russia introduced the general conscription in 1874, many Mennonites migrated to the US and Canada. The members of the Menno Colony moved to Paraguay from Canada when universal, secular compulsory education was implemented in 1917 that required the use of the English language. More conservative Mennonites saw this as a threat to the religious basis of their community. In 1927, 1743 pioneers came from Canada to Paraguay and turned the arid Chaco into fertile farmland over the years. It was the first Mennonite colony in the region.

In the beginning, the pioneers in the Chaco had to overcome many adversities. Many became sick due to the lack of medical care, of whom 121 died and some 60 families returned to Canada.

In 1930, another wave of Russian Mennonite immigrants arrived in the Chaco area from Russia (mostly via a temporary stop in Germany) and founded the Fernheim Colony. They were fleeing the persecution by the Communists and a bad economic situation that was caused by the collectivization in the Soviet Union and eventually led to the Holodomor. More Russian Mennonites fled to the west with the receding German Army at the end of WW2 fearing persecution, Russian forced labor camps and deportation. Some 3,500 of these Mennonites arrived in Paraguay and founded Neuland and Volendam colonies in 1947.

Origin and languages

The vast majority of Mennonites in Paraguay, spread out over nineteen colonies across Paraguay, are of the Russian Mennonite variety, meaning they are originally of Dutch ancestry and can trace their history to the Mennonite settlement in the Vistula Delta, from where they migrated to the Russian Empire and later to the Americas. The percentage of the Mennonites of Paraguay who came directly from Russia is 25 percent. 51 percent came from Russia via Canada, where they lived for several decades and a further 22% from Russia via Canada via Mexico (some from Mexico via Belize). 

Smaller groups of Swiss German or Old Order Amish also exist in Paraguay, making up about two percent, and are descendants of Amish immigrants from the United States, who came originally from Switzerland and Southern Germany. 

The Russian Mennonite majority share a common ancestry, Plautdietsch language, and many other traditions, which are quite distinct from the small group of Amish Mennonite in Paraguay, who speak Pennsylvania German along with English.

Demography

There were 22,710 ethnic Mennonites living in Paraguay in 1987 and 29,045 in 2000. Plautdietsch speakers were estimated 40,000 in 2007 according to Ethnologue.

Major colonies
There are two major Mennonite concentrations in Paraguay. The first one in the Gran Chaco region (West), and the second one in Eastern Paraguay.

In 2014, Menno Colony had about 10,000 inhabitants, Fernheim about 5,000, and Neuland about 3,500.. A 2020 survey found that there are more than 200 Mennonite colonies in nine Latin American countries, with 27 in Paraguay.

Mennonites of the Central Chaco
The Central Chaco region probably has the highest concentration of ethnic Mennonites anywhere in Latin America. Ethnic Germans (almost all of them Mennonites) formed 32% of the total population of the Central Chaco as of 2005. Only Paraguayan Indians (52%) were more numerous compared to them. Latin Paraguayans, the majority ethnic group in Paraguay, constituted just 11% and Braziguayans and Argentines another 5%.

Mennonites have received some criticism from human rights organizations for their relations with a number of indigenous tribes, including the Ayoreo people in Paraguay.

Conservative Mennonites

Colonies of Conservative Mennonites can be found in Asunción, Catupyry, Colony Florida, Canindeyú Department, Itapúa Department, and in Hohenau.

See also

Bibliography
 Gerhard Ratzlaff et al.: Lexikon der Mennoniten in Paraguay. Asunción 2009.
 Peter Klassen: Die Mennoniten in Paraguay : Reich Gottes und Reich dieser Welt. Bolanden 1988.
 Hendrik Hack: Die Kolonisation der Mennoniten im paraguayischen Chaco. Den Haag 1961.

References

 
Immigration to Paraguay